The whitespotted garden eel (Gorgasia maculata), also known as the Indian spaghetti eel, is an eel in the family Congridae (conger/garden eels). It was described by Wolfgang Klausewitz and Irenäus Eibl-Eibesfeldt in 1959. It is a marine, tropical eel which is known from the Indo-Western Pacific, including Maldives, the Solomon Islands, the Philippines, the Cocos Islands, Comoros, India, Indonesia, and Papua New Guinea.

Due to its wide range and lack of known major threats, the IUCN redlist lists the whitespotted garden eel as Least Concern.

References

External links
 

Gorgasia
Taxa named by Wolfgang Klausewitz
Taxa named by Irenäus Eibl-Eibesfeldt
Fish described in 1959